Delalah County is one of the 141 Cadastral divisions of New South Wales.

Delalah is believed to be derived from a local Aboriginal word and is also the name of Delalah Downs property – within the county area.

Parishes  within this county
A full list of parishes found within this county; their current LGA  and mapping coordinates to the approximate centre of each location is as follows:

From 2009, the parishes of Delalah lie within District H of the Darling Livestock Health and Pest District.

References

Counties of New South Wales